Neosilurus pseudospinosus, commonly known as falsespine catfish, is a species of catfish native to northwestern Australia.

References

Freshwater fish of Australia
Venomous fish
Fish described in 1998
pseudospinosus